In numerical linear algebra, the Bartels–Stewart algorithm is used to numerically solve the Sylvester matrix equation . Developed by R.H. Bartels and G.W. Stewart in 1971, it was the first numerically stable method that could be systematically applied to solve such equations. In 1979, G. Golub, C. Van Loan and S. Nash introduced an improved version of the algorithm, known as the Hessenberg–Schur algorithm. It remains a standard approach for solving  Sylvester equations when  is of small to moderate size.

The algorithm 
Then, the matrix equation  has a unique solution. The Bartels–Stewart algorithm computes  by applying the following steps: 

1.Compute the real Schur decompositions

 

 

2. Set 

3. Solve the  simplified system , where . This can be done using forward substitution on the blocks. Specifically, if , then

 

When , columns   should be concatenated and solved for simultaneously. 

4. Set

Computational cost 

Simplifications and special cases 
This symmetry can be exploited so that  is found more efficiently in step 3 of the algorithm.

The Hessenberg–Schur algorithm 
The Hessenberg–Schur algorithm replaces the decomposition  in step 1 with the decomposition , where  is an  upper-Hessenberg matrix. This leads to a system of the form  that can be solved using forward substitution.

Software and implementation 
The subroutines required for the Hessenberg-Schur variant of the Bartels–Stewart  algorithm are implemented in the SLICOT library. These are used in the MATLAB control system toolbox.

Alternative approaches 
For large systems, the  cost of the Bartels–Stewart algorithm can be prohibitive. These include projection-based methods, which use Krylov subspace iterations, methods based on the alternating direction implicit (ADI) iteration, and hybridizations that involve both projection and ADI. Iterative methods can also be used to directly construct low rank approximations to  when solving .

References 

Algorithms
Control theory
Matrices
Numerical linear algebra